The Friar in the Well is a traditional folk song Roud 116 and Child ballad 276 .

Synopsis

A friar tries to seduce a maiden.  She cites fear of hell for refusing.  He says he could whistle her out.  She hangs a cloth in front of the well and invites him home, with directions to bring money.  Then, she declares that her father is coming and tells him to hide behind the cloth.  He falls in.  When he pleads for help, she tells him that if he can get her out of hell, he can whistle himself out of the well.  Sometimes she reminds him that St. Francis never taught his friars to seduce maidens.  Eventually she helps him out, refuses to return his money, and sends him home, dripping wet.  The story spreads, and she is commended for her cleverness.

Recordings
Martin Carthy recorded a version on his album Out of the Cut and played it with Brass Monkey at Barnsley Acoustic Roots Festival in 2012.

References

External links
The Friar in the Well

Child Ballads
Year of song unknown
Songwriter unknown